Carioca tigre is a 1976 Italian-Brazilian adventure-comedy film directed by Giuliano Carnimeo and starring Aldo Maccione and Michael Coby.

Plot
Arrived clandestinely in Rio de Janeiro, Carletto runs into the smuggler "Tigre" and his assistant Augusto and being mistaken by the two for a spy he risks being killed until the "Tigre" discovers that Carletto is Italian like him and decides to spare his life appropriating part of the inheritance that Carletto came to collect. From the notary, the three discover that the inheritance consists in a precious pistol stolen from the mafia boss Don Rosolino and hidden in a place called "Capolinea"; the boss wants to retrieve the gun, proof of his murders, and tries to kill Carletto through some hit men and fails. Carletto, Augusto and the "Tigre" set off on a journey and manage to escape from a kidnapping hatched by the boss, giving up the white suit of the "Tiger" to another man who is mistaken for the smuggler. Later, Carletto and Augusto are captured but manage to escape, while the "Tiger" meets a woman who reveals to him that the "Capolinea" is actually a prison duty Carletto's father had been locked up. Don Rosalino also arrives at the penitentiary thanks to the report of a prisoner trying to steal the gun found by the "Tiger" hidden in an aquarium: after a fight the mafia boss is arrested while the three pretending to be police officers manage to escape with the gun. Back in Rio, the "Tigre" and Carletto discover they have won the lottery, but the ticket is in the suit of the "Tigre" given to a man in the forest: the three decide to leave for a new journey.

Cast 
 Aldo Maccione as  Tigre 
Michael Coby as Carlo Parodi  
 Augusto Enrique Alves as  Augusto 
 Cesar Romero as  Don Rosalindo Y Guana 
 Luciana Turina as  Melisanda  
 Luigi Bonos as  Talazar 
 Milton Gonçalves as  Macumbeiro 
 Jacques Herlin as  Kibbutz 
 Grande Otelo as  Omero 
 Enzo Robutti as Baltazar

See also 
 List of Italian films of 1976

References

External links

Brazilian adventure comedy films
Italian adventure comedy films
1970s adventure comedy films
Films directed by Giuliano Carnimeo
1970s Italian-language films
1976 films
1970s Italian films